Asiatolida is a genus of beetles in the family Mordellidae, consisting of Asiatolida miyatakei.

When Shiyake first described this genus, he also included Asiatolida melana .

References

Mordellinae
Mordellidae genera
Monotypic Cucujiformia genera